Patarenes may refer to:

 members of the Pataria, 11th-century religious movement in the Archdiocese of Milan in northern Italy
 heretics better known as Cathars, members of a Christian dualist sect
 members of the Bosnian Church, considered to be a part of the Cathar movement by Italian writers against heresy